Paulo Freire Social Justice Charter School is a public charter high school in Chicopee, Massachusetts. It was originally located in Holyoke, Massachusetts, but relocated to its present location 6 years later. It primarily serves students in nearby towns such as; Holyoke, Chicopee, Springfield, West Springfield, Westfield, and South Hadley. The school has a main focus on the social and emotional well-being of its students.

History
In February of 2012, the Massachusetts' Board of Elementary and Secondary Education announced Paulo Freire Social Justice Charter School was one of four schools that was granted permission to operate and allowed the naming after Friere. The school opened in September 2013. The school first started out in Holyoke, Massachusetts from its founding until the end of the 2018–19 school year. Moving a town over to the former Pope Francis Catholic High School building in Chicopee in 2019. It is named after the leftist Brazilian educator Paulo Freire.

Athletics

Boys' Basketball 
1x Western Mass Class C; 2022

Girls' volleyball
The program has won 2 Western Mass Championships and only won one State Championship.

2x Western Mass Class B; 2021, 2022
1x MIAA Div. 5; 2021

References

External links
 Official site

2013 establishments in Massachusetts
Educational institutions established in 2013
Public high schools in Massachusetts
Schools in Holyoke, Massachusetts
Schools in Chicopee, Massachusetts
Charter schools in Massachusetts